Spilarctia gurkoi is a moth in the family Erebidae. It was described by Vladimir Viktorovitch Dubatolov and Yasunori Kishida in 2010. It is found in the Mentawai Islands of Indonesia.

References

  & , 2010: Praephragmatobia gen. nov., a new subgenus of the Spilarctia strigatula group, with a preliminary review of species (Lepidoptera: Arctiidae). Tinea 21 (2): 98-111. Full article: .

Moths described in 2010
gurkoi